A vineyard is a yard of grape vines.

Vineyard may also refer to:

People
Dave Vineyard (born 1941), American baseball player
James Russell Vineyard (1801-1863), American politician

Places

Australia
Vineyard, New South Wales

Jamaica
Vineyard Town, Kingston

United States
Vineyard, California
Vineyards, Florida
Vineyard, Kentucky
Vineyard, Utah
Vineyard (UTA station), a planned station for the commuter train FrontRunner
Martha's Vineyard, an island off Massachusetts

Religious
Lord's Vineyard, a name given to the Christian Church; see, for example, Spiritual Exercises of Ignatius of Loyola
 Association of Vineyard Churches, also known as the "Vineyard Movement"
Vineyard Churches UK and Ireland, the national body for this movement in the United Kingdom and Ireland

See also
The Vineyard (disambiguation)